Tom Mike Apostol (August 20, 1923 – May 8, 2016) was an American analytic number theorist and professor at the California Institute of Technology, best known as the author of widely used mathematical textbooks.

Life and career
Apostol was born in Helper, Utah. His parents, Emmanouil Apostolopoulos and Efrosini Papathanasopoulos, were Greek immigrants. Apostolopoulos's name was shortened to Mike Apostol when he obtained his  United States citizenship, and Tom Apostol inherited this Americanized surname.

Apostol received his Bachelor of Science in chemical engineering in 1944, Master's degree in mathematics from the University of Washington in 1946, and a PhD in mathematics from the University of California, Berkeley in 1948. Thereafter Apostol was a faculty member at UC Berkeley, MIT, and Caltech. He was the author of several influential graduate and undergraduate level textbooks.

Apostol was the creator and project director for Project MATHEMATICS! producing videos which explore basic topics in high school mathematics. He helped popularize the visual calculus devised by Mamikon Mnatsakanian with whom he also wrote a number of papers, many of which appeared in the American Mathematical Monthly.  Apostol also provided academic content for an acclaimed video lecture series on introductory physics, The Mechanical Universe.

In 2001, Apostol was elected in the Academy of Athens. He received a Lester R. Ford Award in 2005, in 2008, and in 2010. In 2012 he became a fellow of the American Mathematical Society.

Bibliography

 Mathematical Analysis: A Modern Approach to Advanced Calculus, (1957) Addison-Wesley, 
 Introduction to Analytic Number Theory, (1976) Springer-Verlag, New York. 
 Modular Functions and Dirichlet Series in Number Theory, (1990) Springer-Verlag, New York. 
 Calculus, Volume 1, One-variable calculus, with an introduction to linear algebra, (1967) Wiley, 
 Calculus, Volume 2, Multi-variable calculus and linear algebra with applications to differential equations and probability, (1969) Wiley, 
 The Mechanical Universe: Mechanics and Heat, Advanced Edition  (with Steven C. Frautschi, Richard P. Olenick, and David L. Goodstein)
 New Horizons in Geometry  (with Mamikon Mnatsakanian)

Notes

External links
 Tom M. Apostol, Professor of Mathematics, Emeritus, Caltech
 A VISUAL Approach to CALCULUS problems
 
 Project MATHEMATICS!

1923 births
2016 deaths
20th-century American mathematicians
21st-century American mathematicians
Greek mathematicians
Number theorists
University of Washington College of Arts and Sciences alumni
UC Berkeley College of Letters and Science alumni
University of California, Berkeley faculty
Massachusetts Institute of Technology School of Science faculty
California Institute of Technology faculty
Fellows of the American Mathematical Society
American textbook writers
People from Helper, Utah
American people of Greek descent
Mathematicians from Utah
University of Washington College of Engineering alumni
Corresponding Members of the Academy of Athens (modern)